Another World is a novel by Pat Barker, published in 1998. The novel concerns Geordie, a 101-year-old Somme veteran in the last days before his death. The main narrator is Geordie's grandson Nick, a schoolteacher who lives in Newcastle with his family.

References

Novels by Pat Barker
1998 British novels
Novels set in Newcastle upon Tyne
Viking Press books